Penny McNamee (born 17 March 1983) is an Australian actress.

Early and personal life
Penny McNamee was born in Sydney to Peter and Helen McNamee. She has three sisters, including actress Jessica McNamee, and a younger brother. Through her sister Rebecca, she is the aunt of actress Teagan Croft. Her cousin, Madelaine Collignon, is a news presenter for Prime7.

McNamee married Matt Tooker, director of a marketing agency, in 2009. They have a son. McNamee gave birth to their second child, a daughter, in March 2019.

Career

Theatre
In 2014, McNamee played the lead role of Jerusha Abbott in John Caird and Paul Gordon's musical Daddy Long Legs. Based on the book of the same name, Daddy Long Legs played at the Florida Studio Theater from February–April.

McNamee is perhaps best known for her portrayal of Nessarose in the original Australian cast of Wicked for which she won the 2009 Green Room Award for Best Female in a Featured Role. The show opened on 12 July 2008, in Melbourne, where it ran for 13 months, closing on 9 August 2009. It then transferred to Sydney from 12 September 2009. McNamee played her final performance at the Capitol Theatre on 12 March 2010.

McNamee originated the role of Jennifer Gabriel in Cameron Mackintosh's production of The Witches of Eastwick. The show opened at the Princess Theatre in Melbourne on 15 July 2002. McNamee was nominated for a Mo Award for Best New Talent.

McNamee portrayed Donna in the Australian premier of Hurlyburly for the Griffin Theatre Company, Sydney. The show opened in May 2005. McNamee starred alongside Alex Dimitriades.

McNamee has performed in Carols in the Domain for Channel 7, Carols by Candlelight for Channel 9 and on Good Morning Australia.

Film
McNamee completed filming on John Duigan's Australian feature film Careless Love, in which she played the lead role of Carol. The film was in postproduction in 2011 and was released in 2012.

In 2006, McNamee starred as Melissa in the Lionsgate US feature film See No Evil alongside Rachael Taylor.

McNamee was cast in Nash Edgerton's award-winning short film Fuel, which was nominated for the Sundance Film Festival.

Television
Her guest roles on various US series include Blue Bloods (CBS), Elementary (CBS) and Political Animals (USA).

in 2010, McNamee played the role of Hope in Tom Hanks and Steven Spielberg's HBO miniseries The Pacific. McNamee and Isabel Lucas play best friends who fell in love with American soldiers during World War II.

McNamee was cast in the supporting role of Ruth Crockett in the Warner Bros. miniseries Salem's Lot. She starred opposite Rob Lowe, and the series was aired on TNT in the USA.

In 2005, McNamee landed a regular role in the Channel 7 series HeadLand as Charlie Cooper.

McNamee won the role of Alice Blakely in the MTV-commissioned pilot Hammer Bay. Jacki Weaver played McNamee's mother in the series.

McNamee has played various guest roles in Australian TV series, including All Saints, White Collar Blue, Satisfaction, and The Harringtons.

McNamee was asked to play opposite award-winning singer/songwriter Ben Lee in the video clip for his hit song "Gamble Everything for Love". Lee went on to win Best Male Artist at the ARIA Awards that year based on this album.

In November 2015, McNamee was announced to have joined the cast of Seven Network soap opera Home and Away, as Tori Morgan, a doctor at the Northern Districts Hospital. She was introduced on 5 May 2016 during the Caravan Park explosion storyline. Penny McNamee was nominated for the Best New Talent Logie Award for her role as Tori Morgan. Penny McNamee had previously auditioned for the roles of Martha MacKenzie, Bianca Scott and Hannah Wilson before landing the role of Tori. She made her final appearance on 27 September 2021, after more than five years in the series.

Filmography

References

External links

Place of birth missing (living people)
Australian film actresses
Living people
Australian television actresses
Actresses from Sydney
1983 births
Australian musical theatre actresses